Gualala is a municipality in the Honduran department of Santa Bárbara.

Demographics
At the time of the 2013 Honduras census, Gualala municipality had a population of 5,191. Of these, 64.99% were Mestizo, 32.76% White, 1.79% Indigenous (1.70% Lenca), 0.44% Black or Afro-Honduran and 0.02% others.

Notable people
Miguel Andonie Fernández (1921–2013), chemist
Jesús Aguilar Paz (1895–1974), chemist, cartographer and folklorist

References

Municipalities of the Santa Bárbara Department, Honduras